The women's 100 metres competition at the 1998 Asian Games in Bangkok, Thailand was held on 13–14 December at the Thammasat Stadium.

Schedule
All times are Indochina Time (UTC+07:00)

Results
Legend
DNF — Did not finish
DSQ — Disqualified

Heats
 Qualification: First 2 in each heat (Q) and the next 2 fastest (q) advance to the final.

Heat 1 
 Wind: +2.7 m/s

Heat 2 
 Wind: +0.8 m/s

Heat 3 
 Wind: +1.5 m/s

Final
 Wind: +2.3 m/s

References

External links
Results

Women's 00100 metres
1998